Francesco I may refer to:

Persons
 Pope Francis  (born 1936, reigned 2013-present), the current Pope, also known in Latin as Franciscus 
 Francesco I Ordelaffi (c. 1300 – 1332)
 Francesco I of Lesbos (died 1384)
 Francesco I Crispo (died 1397)
 Francesco I Gonzaga (1366–1407)
 Francesco I Acciaioli (fl. 1451–1453)
 Francesco I Sforza (1401–1466)
 Francesco I d'Este, Duke of Modena (1610–1658) 
 Francesco I of the Two Sicilies (1777–1830)

Fictional characters
 Papa Francesco I, the fictional pope / character in the 1979 Walter Murphy novel Vicar of Christ

See also
 Francis I (disambiguation)